Archie Duncan may refer to:

 Archie Duncan (historian) (1926–2017), Scottish historian
 Archie Duncan (actor) (1914–1979), Scottish actor